This is a list of notable Germans of Italian descent.

Activists 

Horst Fantazzini (1939–2001), anarchist
 Bruno Tesch (1913–1933), antifascist

Arts 

 Joseph Ignaz Appiani (1834–1903), painter
 Alexander Calandrelli (1834–1903), sculptor
 Maximilian Dasio, painter
 Bonaventura Genelli, painter
 Janus Genelli, painter
 Luigi Mayer (1755–1803), painter
 Alexander Molinari (1772–1831), painter
 Conrad Schnitzler (1937–2001), musician

Business 

Daniela Cavallo, business executive
Johann Maria Farina, perfumier
Friedrich Grillo, businessman
Gaetano Medini, chef
Joseph Anton von Maffei, industrialist
Henriette Wegner, philanthropist

Entertainment 

 Tatjana Gürbaca, opera director
 Francesco Stefani (1923–1989), TV director

Actors 

Mario Adorf, actor
Gedeon Burkhard, actor
Tristano Casanova, actor
Hardy Krüger Jr., actor
Oliver Masucci, actor
Denis Moschitto, actor
Krista Posch, actress
Franka Potente, actress
Elisabeth Röhm, actress
Roberto Saccà, actor
Tonio Selwart (1896–2002), actor
Chiara Schoras, actress
Lisa Vicari, actress

Models 

Janine Habeck, model

Musicians 

Nino de Angelo, singer
Lou Bega, singer
Ferruccio Busoni, composer, pianist, conductor, editor, writer, and piano teacher
Mandy Capristo, singer
Johann Peter Cavallo (1819–1892), pianist
Franz Danzi (1763–1826), composer & conductor
Daniel Küblböck (1985-2021), singer
Toni Landomini, rapper, better known as Toni L
Francesca Lebrun (1756–1791), singer & composer
Pietro Lombardi, singer
Sarah Lombardi, singer
Bruno Maderna, conductor and composer
Daniele Negroni, singer
Oonagh, singer
Nevio Passaro, singer-songwriter
Mille Petrozza, guitarist & singer
Raphael Ragucci, rapper, better known as RAF Camora
Calogero Randazzo, rap music producer, better known as 
Andrea Renzullo, singer
Roberto Saccà, opera singer
Daniel Sluga, rap music producer, better known as 
Enrico Di Ventura, rapper, better known as 
Giovanni Zarrella, singer and TV presenter

Journalism (print & multimedia) 

Giovanni di Lorenzo, journalist
, TV presenter
Ingo Zamperoni, TV presenter and journalist

Military 

 Albrecht Brandi (1914–1966), naval commander
 Wilhelm Canaris (1887–1945), admiral
 Wilhelm Crisolli (1895–1944), general

Politics & law 

Heinrich von Brentano (1904–1964), politician
Lars Castellucci, politician
Udo Di Fabio, legal scholar & judge
Manuel Gava, politician
Victor Perli, politician
Fabio De Masi, politician
Thilo Sarrazin, politician
Tino Schwierzina, politician
Anne Spiegel, politician
Jessica Tatti, politician
Leo von Caprivi, general and statesman

Science 
Johannes Agnoli (1925—2003), political scientist
Bernhard Bolzano, mathematician, logician, philosopher, theologian and Catholic priest
Franz Brentano, philosopher & psychologist
Lujo Brentano, economist
Angela D. Friederici, linguist & neuropsychologist
Vittorio Hösle, philosopher
Romano Guardini, Catholic priest, author, and academic
Rocco Guerrini (1525—1596), military engineer
Marcello Pirani, scientist
Philipp J. J. Valentini, explorer & archaeologist

Sports 

, basketball player and manager
Rudolf Caracciola, racing driver
Stefano Caruso, ice dancer
Johnny Cecotto Jr., racing driver
Sandro Cortese, motorcycle racer
Marcello Craca, tennis player
Laura Dell'Angelo, tennis player
Matthias de Zordo, javelin thrower
Cathleen Martini, bobsledder
Alexandra Mazzucco, handball player
Pasquale Passarelli, wrestler
Graciano Rocchigiani, boxer
Ralf Rocchigiani, boxer
Giovanna Scoccimarro, judoka
Lorenzo Suding, mountain bike racer
Christian Thun, boxer

Football players

Alessandro Abruscia
Domenico Alberico
Sergio Allievi
Marcos Álvarez
Marcel Appiah
Angelo Barletta

Frank Benatelli
Rico Benatelli
Christian Brucia
Marco Calamita
Daniel Caligiuri
Marco Caligiuri

Giovanni Cannata
Massimo Cannizzaro
Guerino Capretti
Giuseppe Catizone
Stefano Celozzi
Fabio Chiarodia
Stefano Cincotta
Diego Contento
Cataldo Cozza
Davis Curiale
Diego Demme
Giovanni Federico
Marco Fiore
Antonio Fischer
Roberto Floriano
Franco Foda
Sandro Foda

Daniele Gabriele
Salvatore Gambino

Gianluca Gaudino
Maurizio Gaudino
Giuseppe Gemiti
Baldo di Gregorio
Vincenzo Grifo
Adriano Grimaldi
Nicola Guglielmelli
Angelo Hauk

Fabio Kaufmann
Gianluca Korte
Raffael Korte
Bruno Labbadia

Giuseppe Leo
Michele Lepore
Gino Lettieri
Mattia Maggio
Gaetano Manno
Vincenzo Marchese

Luca Marseiler
Gianluca Marzullo
Roberto Massimo
Lukas Mazagg
Fabian Messina
Fabio Di Michele Sanchez
Giuliano Modica
Riccardo Montolivo
Fabio Morena

Oliver Neuville
Massimo Ornatelli
Silvio Pagano
Vincenzo Palumbo
Antonio Pangallo
Raoul Petretta

Marco Pezzaiuoli
Kevin Pezzoni
Giuseppe Pisano
Gustav Policella
Massimilian Porcello
Leandro Putaro
Giuseppe Reina

Michele Rizzi
Calogero Rizzuto
Stefano Russo
Antonio Di Salvo
Nicola Sansone
Flavio Santoro

Gian Luca Schulz
Nico Schulz
Yomi Scintu
Maurizio Scioscia
Sandro Sirigu
Elia Soriano
Roberto Soriano
Giovanni Speranza
Domenico Tedesco
Mike Terranova
Marco Terrazzino
Raffael Tonello

Nicolò Tresoldi
Mattia Trianni
Camillo Ugi
Angelo Vaccaro
Enrico Valentini
Felice Vecchione
Luciano Velardi
Maurizio Vella
Marco Villa
Fabio Viteritti

Writers 

Gisela von Arnim (1827–1889), writer
Bernard von Brentano (1901–1964), writer & journalist
Christian Brentano (1784–1851), writer
Clemens Brentano (1778–1842), poet and novelist
Hans Carossa (1878–1956), writer
Ralph Giordano (1923–2014), writer
Oskar Panizza (1853–1921), writer

Italian diaspora by country
Italian diaspora in Europe
 
Ethnic groups in Germany
Germany–Italy relations